Ajawa is an extinct Afro-Asiatic language formerly spoken in Bauchi State, Nigeria.  Ajawa became extinct between 1920 and 1940 as speakers switched to Hausa.

Notes

External links 
OLAC resources in and about the Ajawa language

West Chadic languages
Extinct languages of Africa